X Factor is a Danish television music competition to find new singing talent. In season 9, Sofie Linde Lauridsen replaced Eva Harlou as host. Thomas Blachman and Remee returned for their respective eighth and sixth seasons as judges, joined by newcomer Mette Lindberg. Lina Rafn, after four seasons as a judge, did not return. The winners were Embrace and Remee became the winning mentor for the third time and for the first time in the Danish X Factor history a judge has won two years in a row.

Judges and hosts

On March 20, 2015, it was reported that Lina Rafn was considering leaving X Factor. Five days later, it was reported that Rafn would be leaving the show. At the final of season 8 on March 27, Rafn said in an interview that she did not know if she would continue as a judge. Thomas Blachman said it was maybe time for three new judges. On June 22, Rafn said that she was in doubt about returning to X Factor because she also wanted to focus on her own career. On June 26, Eva Harlou announced that she would not be returning as host for season 9. On June 29, it was announced that Sofie Linde Lauridsen would replace Harlou as host. On 14 July, it was reported that Rafn had left the show. The following day, it was announced that Rafn would not be returning as a judge for season 9. On 10 August, it was announced that the judges would be announced on 12 August.

Selection process

Auditions
Auditions took place in Copenhagen and Aarhus.

5 Chair Challenge
The 5 Chair Challenge was back for the ninth season. Mette Lindberg mentored the 15-22s, Thomas Blachman has the Over 23s and Remee has the Groups.

The 15 successful acts were:
15-22s: Alex, Anna, Elena, Mads Christian, Reem
Over 23s: Andrew, Cirke, Heidi, Jacob, Sarah
Groups: 3 Levels, Clifforth & Hein, The Competition, Embrace, Katinka & Sigrid

Bootcamp
Remee, Lindberg and Blachman took their contestants to the island of Fejø. Each judge had their own base. Lindberg took the 15-22s to an old mill, Blachman took the Over 23s to a nursing home, and Remee took the Groups to a bath yard.

The 6 eliminated acts were:
15-22s: Anna, Elena
Over 23s: Cirke, Heidi
Groups: 3 Levels, Katinka & Sigrid

Changes
For the first time in the Danish X Factor, the two contestants in the bottom two would not sing the same song they sang earlier in the live show, they would pick their own song.

Contestants

Key:
 – Winner
 – Runner-up

Live shows
The live shows started on February 19, 2016 at DR Byen. 
Colour key

Contestants' colour key:

Live show details

Week 1 (February 19)
Theme:  Signature

Judges' votes to eliminate
 Lindberg: Sarah Glerup
 Remee: Jacob Bering
 Blachman: Jacob Bering

Week 2 (February 26)
Theme:  Scandinavian songs
Musical guest:  Julie Bergan ("All Hours")

Judges' votes to eliminate
 Remee: Sarah Glerup
 Blachman: The Competition
 Lindberg: Sarah Glerup

Week 3 (March 4)
Theme:  Songs from the contestant's birthyears

Judges' votes to eliminate
 Lindberg: The Competition
 Remee: Mads Christian
 Blachman: The Competition

Week 4 (March 11)
Theme:  Radiohits (songs that have been in the top 10 on the Danish airplay chart)

Judges' votes to eliminate
 Lindberg: Refused to choose between two of her contestants 
 Blachman: Mads Christian
 Remee: Mads Christian

Week 5 (March 18)
Theme:  David Bowie songs
Musical guest: Emilie Esther ("Inescapable")
Group Performance: "Let's Dance" 

Judges' votes to eliminate
 Lindberg: Clifforth & Hein
 Remee: Alex Benson
 Blachman: Clifforth & Hein

Week 6: Semi-final (25 March)
 Theme: Viewers choice; Audition songs
 Musical guest: Citybois ("Purple light") and ("Hot body")

The semi-final did not feature a final showdown and instead the act with the fewest public votes, Andrew Murray, was automatically eliminated.

Week 7: Final (1 April) 
 Theme: Free Choice; Duet with Musical Guests; winner's single
 Musical guest: Phlake ("Angel Zoo") and ("Pregnant")
 Group Performances: "Never Forget You" (MNEK and Zara Larsson; Performed of Alex Benson, Reem Hamze, and Embrace); "Thank You for the Music"/"Watch Me (Whip/Nae Nae)" (ABBA/Silentó) ; (auditionees); "History" (One Direction) (Performed of X Factor 2016 contestants)

References

Season 09
The X Factor seasons
2016 Danish television seasons